Events in the year 1863 in Brazil.

Incumbents
Monarch – Pedro II.
Prime Minister – Marquis of Olinda.

Events

Births
 19 November - Borges de Medeiros

Deaths

References

 
1860s in Brazil
Years of the 19th century in Brazil
Brazil
Brazil